Špiljani is a village located in the municipality of Tutin, southwestern Serbia. According to the 2011 census, the village has a population of 275 inhabitants. A border crossing between Serbia and Montenegro is located in the village.

References

Populated places in Raška District